The Evergreen G class is a series of 11 container ships built for Evergreen Marine by Imabari Shipbuilding in Japan. The maximum theoretical capacity of these ships is in the range of 20,124 to 20,388 twenty-foot equivalent unit (TEU).

History
The ships constitute 11 out of 13 container ships built to the Imabari 20000. TEU containership design developed by Imabari Shipbuilding. Evergreen time charters all 11 ships from their owner, Shoei Kisen Kaisha, which is a leasing subsidiary of Imabari Shipbuilding. On 30 March 2018 the first ship, the Ever Golden, was delivered with a capacity of 20,338 TEU.

In 2019, Evergreen announced it would be putting scrubbers on many of their ships in order to lower polluting emissions. Ever Glory and all newer ships were built with scrubbers already installed. These scrubbers take up a considerable amount of space and the resulting capacity of these ships is slightly reduced to 20,160 TEU. The previous ships that did not have scrubbers when they were built had them retrofitted. This has reduced their capacity to 20,124 TEU.

Accidents and incidents 
On 9 February 2019, the Ever Given collided with the ferry Finkenwerder, which was docked at a wharf in Hamburg on the river Elbe at the time. The Finkenwerder was heavily damaged.

In March 2021, Ever Given ran aground and blocked the Suez Canal for 6 days. The ship was freed but then held in the Great Bitter Lake over a 900 million dollar compensation claim by the Suez Canal Authority.

List of ships

See also 
 Evergreen A-class container ship: Evergreen Marine's largest container ships since 30 July 2021

References 

Container ship classes
Evergreen Group
Ships built in Japan